John W. Krafft (1888–1958) was an American journalist and screenwriter. He worked for newspapers before becoming a titles writer during the silent film era and then a screenwriter.

He graduated from Manual Training High School in Indianapolis in 1907. He worked at the Indianapolis News and then the Indianapolis Star.

Filmography
The Angel of Broadway (1927), intertitles
Stand and Deliver (1928 film)
The Cop (1928 film), co-writer
Celebrity (1928 film) co-wrote film adaptation
Love Over Night (1928), titles
Strange Cargo (1929 film), co-writer
A Blonde for a Night (1928), co-writer
The Spieler (1928), co-writer
The Blue Danube (1928 film), titles
Death from a Distance (1935), original story and screenplay
Men of Action (1935)
The 13th Man (1937)
Telephone Operator (film) (1937), story
Here's Flash Casey (1937), screenplay
Convict's Code (1939), writer
In Old Cheyenne (1941), original story
Man from Headquarters (1942), screenwriter
Foreign Agent (1942), screenwriter
Deerslayer (1943), adaptation
Smart Guy (1943), screenwriter
Tell It to a Star (1945)

References

20th-century American journalists
20th-century American male writers
20th-century American screenwriters
Writers from Indianapolis
1888 births
Journalists from Indiana
1958 deaths
American male journalists
American male screenwriters
Screenwriters from Indiana